Shin is a Taiwanese five-man Mandopop  rock band who debuted in 2002 with their self-titled album, Shin. The name 'Shin' came from the groups's former lead vocalist, Shin. Other members include guitarist Chris, bass player Max, keyboard player Tomi, and drummer Michael.

Apart from Shin's home market of Taiwan, the band also have fans in Mainland China, Hong Kong and among overseas Chinese.  The track "一了百了" is listed at number 38 on Hit Fm Taiwan's Hit Fm Annual Top 100 Singles Chart (Hit-Fm年度百首單曲) for 2002.

On 20 March 2007, lead vocalist Shin left the band to launch his solo career. The remaining members spend the next few years looking for a new lead vocalist. In early 2010, Shin debut with new lead singer Liu Wenjie.

Band members

Current members
 Michael (黃邁可) - drums (2002-present)
 Tomi (傅超華)  - keyboard (2002-present)
 Chris (孫志群) - guitar (2002-present)
 Max (劉曉華) - bass guitar (2002-present)
 Liu Wenjie (劉文傑) - lead vocals (2010-present)

Former members
Shin 信 (蘇見信) - lead vocals (2002–2007)

Discography

Filmography
 死了都要愛 - starring role
 At the Dolphin Bay (海豚灣戀人) - cameo
 Westside Story (西街少年) - Chris, Tomi and Shin cameo

References

External links
 Music Nation Wingman
  SHIN@Avex Taiwan homepage (2002–2006)

Taiwanese rock music groups
Mandopop musical groups